The 2015 British Superbike Championship season was the 28th British Superbike Championship season. It began at Donington Park on 6 April and ended at the Brands Hatch GP circuit on 18 October. Shane Byrne is the defending champion.

Teams and riders

Race calendar and results

Championship standings

Riders' championship

Manufacturers' championship

References

External links

British Superbike Championship
Superbike Championship
British